Yaakov Noach Litzman (born 2 September 1948) is an Israeli politician and former government minister. A follower of the Ger Hasidic dynasty, he heads Agudat Yisrael, part of the United Torah Judaism alliance, in the Knesset. He previously served as Minister of Health and Minister of Housing and Construction. Litzman resigned from the Knesset in June 2022, as part of a plea agreement in which he admitted criminally obstructing the extradition of alleged pedophile Malka Leifer.

Biography
Litzman was born on 2 September 1948 to Polish survivors of the Holocaust, in a displaced persons camp in Germany. When he was two years old, the family immigrated to the East New York section of Brooklyn, and then to the Borough Park section of Brooklyn, where he grew up. In 1966, at age 17, he immigrated to Israel, and continued his Torah studies.

Litzman is married, has five children, and lives in Jerusalem. He is quoted as saying that, "in some respects, I envy the low profile the Haredi community in the United States has been able to retain by staying out of politics". He also said that, in Israel, the media attention makes for misrepresentation and misunderstanding of the Haredi community.

Career

His first job was as principal of the Hasidic Beis Yaakov girls' school in Jerusalem. He became active in politics under the guidance of the then-Gerrer Rebbe, Rabbi Simcha Binem Alter. Over time, Litzman became known as the rebbe's right-hand man, a role he continues under the present Gerrer Rebbe, Rabbi Yaakov Arye Alter. In 1999, the present rebbe asked Litzman to join the Agudat Yisrael faction of the United Torah Judaism list for the Knesset elections that year. He was subsequently elected, and became Chairman of the Finance Committee. He headed the UTJ list for the 2003 elections, and was re-elected, again becoming the Chair of the Finance Committee. He has since served as the leader of the UTJ and Agudat Yisrael faction in the Knesset, in which he consults the Gerrer Rebbe on a daily basis.

Litzman was re-elected again in 2006, retaining his chairmanship of the Finance Committee, and for a fourth time in 2009, after which UTJ joined the new government, in which Litzman was appointed Deputy Minister of Health, despite having no medical training or expertise. After Litzman was re-elected in 2013, UTJ were excluded from the coalition government. However, following the 2015 elections, he was re-appointed Deputy Minister of Health. Subsequently, Litzman appointed the first non-physician to serve as general-director of the Ministry of Health, in a move that was criticized by the Israel Medical Association. Litzman was appointed on 27 August 2015, Minister of Health, after a court challenge filed by Yesh Atid.

Litzman served on the Knesset's Internal Affairs Committee from 1999 to 2001, and as the Deputy Chairman of the Knesset Labor and Welfare Committee. As part of the coalition agreement with the ruling government of Ariel Sharon in 2001, Litzman was appointed chairman of the Knesset Finance Committee, a position he held until 2003, and again from 2005 to 2007.

He formally resigned as health minister on 26 November 2017, in protest of railroad repair work happening on the Sabbath, becoming deputy health minister instead, while Prime Minister Benjamin Netanyahu nominally held the office, with Litzman acting as de facto minister.

When Netanyahu was forced to resign the health office, among others, due to the pending prosecution of three criminal cases against him, on 29 December 2019, despite a recommendation by Israeli police to criminally prosecute Litzman in two separate cases, he was again appointed health minister. The move prompted backlash, including an open letter to Netanyahu from Zionist Federation of Australia president Jeremy Leibler calling the promotion of Litzman "a slap in the face to the Australian Jewish Community, the Australian people, the community of Australian [immigrants] in Israel, and, most shockingly, to the survivors of Malka Leifer's alleged abuse".

Coronavirus pandemic 

Litzman has served as minister of health from the start of the coronavirus pandemic, and has been criticized for an "unprofessional handling" of the crisis. Due to his exceptionally lenient attitude toward enforcing health guidelines in ultra-Orthodox communities from the start of the crisis, major outbreaks appeared in ultra-Orthodox communities throughout Israel.

In an interview in March 2020, Litzman stated: "I am sure that the messiah will come by Passover and save us the same way God saved us during the exodus, and we were freed. The messiah will come and save us all."

Later in March, an open letter was penned to Prime Minister Benjamin Netanyahu and Blue and White leader Benny Gantz by many heads of hospital departments and senior doctors, as well as medical officials, lamenting years of neglect that left the country's health care system at its lowest point during the time of coronavirus outbreak, and urged that Litzman be replaced as a result.

On 2 April 2020, Litzman and his wife tested positive for COVID-19, while acting as Minister of Health. He was the first member of the cabinet to be infected. As a result, he self-quarantined, and began working from home. Israel's Shin Bet reviewed Litzman's phone after his COVID-19 diagnosis to track his movements, and the Health Ministry maintained that anyone who came into contact with him has been contacted personally. Top ministers in Israel's government were furious at Litzman for flouting social distancing guidelines after he and his wife tested positive for the coronavirus, with senior officials accusing Litzman of putting his colleagues' lives in danger, while knowingly breaking his own ministry's safety rules regarding the virus. Litzman was spotted praying at the home of a fellow member of his Hasidic sect three days after government guidelines went into effect barring such services. Additionally, after the guidelines had further intensified, Litzman was again spotted praying at a synagogue just outside his home.

With the Thirty-fifth government of Israel, Litzman resigned from the Knesset as part of the Norwegian Law, and was sworn in as Minister of Housing and Construction. On 13 September 2020, Litzman resigned as Minister of Housing and Construction, in protest over a nationwide coronavirus shutdown scheduled to begin over the High Holidays of Rosh HaShanah, Yom Kippur, and Sukkot, beginning on the first night on Rosh HaShanah, 19 September, for at least three weeks. On 18 November, he was re-appointed as Minister of Housing and Construction.

Plea deal, resignation and retirement 
In the runup to the 2021 Israeli legislative election, it was announced that Moshe Gafni would replace Litzman as leader of UTJ in the following Knesset. After the election and with the swearing in of the Thirty-sixth government of Israel, UTJ found itself in opposition for the first time since 2015. For the first time in his political career, he was not chair of a Knesset committee, a minister or deputy minister, or leader of a party. He announced in December 2021 that he would not run for reelection to the Knesset, citing his advanced age.

In January 2022, Litzman signed a plea deal admitting that he had criminally assisted alleged paedophile Malka Leifer's attempt to evade extradition to Australia. Several other charges against Litzman relating to his activities as health minister were dropped as part of the plea agreement. The plea deal required Litzman to pay a nominal fine and to resign from the Knesset, which he did on 1 June 2022. In June 2022, Litzman was replaced as head of UTJ by Yitzhak Goldknopf.

Other acts

Statement on LGBT rights
During a February 2016 discussion in the Knesset about Israeli health authorities becoming more sensitive towards LGBT people, Litzman compared LGBT people to the sinners who danced around the Golden Calf.

Smoking regulation
Litzman has been criticized over policies and statements that seemed to serve the interests of the tobacco companies, including hindering some efforts to curb cigarette ads. For example, in his first tenure as deputy health minister (2009-2013), Litzman opposed warning labels and stickers that depict the effects of smoking, despite their role in reducing the habit in other countries. Litzman argued that the images of dirty lungs and teeth aimed at discouraging children and youth from smoking were "unaesthetic", stating, "With the help of God, we won't approve this... We don't need to disfigure the State with such images."

In his second tenure (starting 2015), Litzman was criticized for opposing legislation prohibiting tobacco advertising in newspapers. Litzman argued that such laws would bankrupt newspapers, which rely on the advertising revenue. It was pointed out that Litzman had a conflict of interest due to his close association with ultra-Orthodox publications (Hamodia in particular) that rely on revenue from the many tobacco ads that they publish. Specifically, Litzman had a particularly strong conflict of interest concerning Hamodia, due to the fact that it is published by his Agudat Yisrael party (part of UTJ), and employs his wife. A bill restricting the marketing of tobacco was finally agreed upon after other MKs threatened to vote against a bill restricting retail operations on Shabbat and Jewish religious holidays. However, Litzman stipulated that he would only agree to the legislation on the (unusual) condition that the ban would not include printed publications (many ultra-Orthodox Jews avoid using the Internet, making printed publications their primary form of media, hence Litzman's primary concern).

Malka Leifer 
Litzman made a plea deal on 27 January 2022 admitting to breach of trust for using his former position as deputy health minister to obstruct the extradition to Australia of Malka Leifer, the accused in the Adass Israel School sex abuse scandal. He had attempted to obtain false psychiatric evaluations that would deem Leifer unfit to face trial in Australia. Israeli police recommended on 6 August 2019 that Litzman be indicted for "fraud and breach of trust" (both related to the Leifer case), as well as bribery in another case. In May 2021, Attorney General Avichai Mandelblit announced that he will indict Litzman for obstruction of justice and breach of trust.

United Hatzalah 
Eli Beer, the president of Israel's United Hatzalah ambulance service, while hospitalized in serious condition in Miami after contracting the coronavirus, lambasted Litzman from his hospital bed for sidelining his medics by refusing to allow Hatzalah's 6,000 volunteers to play any role in assisting the Health Ministry and Magen David Adom with conducting virus tests. Litzman argued that Hatzalah staff were less professional.

References

External links

 Minister Litzman Wins Poll As Most Liked Minister
 Poll ranks Health Minister Litzman higher than Netanyahu - Israel News - Jerusalem Post
 "LGBT People Know That They’re Sinners" - AWiderBridge

1948 births
Living people
Agudat Yisrael politicians
American emigrants to Israel
20th-century American Jews
Ger (Hasidic dynasty)
Government ministers of Israel
Haredi rabbis in Israel
Israeli Jews
Israeli people of American-Jewish descent
Israeli people of Polish-Jewish descent
Jewish Israeli politicians
Members of the 15th Knesset (1999–2003)
Members of the 16th Knesset (2003–2006)
Members of the 17th Knesset (2006–2009)
Members of the 18th Knesset (2009–2013)
Members of the 19th Knesset (2013–2015)
Members of the 20th Knesset (2015–2019)
Members of the 21st Knesset (2019)
Members of the 22nd Knesset (2019–2020)
Members of the 23rd Knesset (2020–2021)
Members of the 24th Knesset (2021–2022)
Ministers of Health of Israel
Ministers of Housing of Israel
People from Borough Park, Brooklyn
People from East New York, Brooklyn
Rabbinic members of the Knesset
United Torah Judaism leaders
21st-century American Jews
Israeli politicians convicted of crimes